Rose Bower is a historic farm complex located at Stoney Creek, Dinwiddie County, Virginia. The first building on the property is the -story kitchen built about 1818 as the primary dwelling.  The main dwelling was built in 1826 during the Federal period, and is a two-story, frame, hall-parlor-plan house with a -story rear ell.  Also on the property are a contributing early well cover, smokehouse, and the Rose family cemetery.

It was listed on the National Register of Historic Places in 1991.

There is also another   Rose Bower' in Devon, England, whose farm  'Narramore'  also has held a smokehouse for fish, kippers & mackerel, a few rabbits too, amazing gardens surrounded on a working stud farm.

References

Houses on the National Register of Historic Places in Virginia
Farms on the National Register of Historic Places in Virginia
National Register of Historic Places in Dinwiddie County, Virginia
Houses completed in 1828
Houses in Dinwiddie County, Virginia